The Dominican Republic competed at the 2015 Summer Universiade in Gwangju, South Korea with 10 competitors in 3 sports. Sprinter Luguelín Santos was the flagbearer.

Medalists

Athletics

Men

Judo

Men

Women

Taekwondo

Men

Women

References

Nations at the 2015 Summer Universiade
Dominican Republic at the Summer Universiade